Harald Torfinn Thune (born 12 May 1952) is a Norwegian civil servant.

He was born in Gulen. He took his education at the University of Bergen, graduating with the cand.jur. degree in 1978. He then embarked on a career as a civil servant.

Thune was hired in the County Governor's Office in Rogaland in 1986. From December 1991 to August 1993 he was acting County Governor, as Tora Aasland had been appointed in 1991 but served as a member of Parliament until 1993. In 2007, when Aasland was appointed to the Stoltenberg's Second Cabinet, Thune was appointed as acting County Governor again.

References

1952 births
Living people
People from Gulen
Norwegian jurists
County governors of Norway
University of Bergen alumni
Rogaland politicians